The Ryan Ministry was the 27th ministry of the Government of Queensland and was led by Premier T. J. Ryan of the Labor Party. It was the first majority Labor government in Queensland's history. It succeeded the Denham Ministry on 1 June 1915, following the latter's defeat at the 1915 state election on 22 May. It was succeeded by the Theodore Ministry on 22 October 1919 following T. J. Ryan's resignation from the Queensland parliament to run for federal politics.

First Ministry
On 1 June 1915, the Governor, Sir Hamilton Goold-Adams, designated eight principal executive offices of the Government, and appointed the following Members of the Parliament of Queensland to the Ministry. They had been chosen by a caucus meeting of the Labor Party the previous day. Initially, as Labor was opposed to the Queensland Legislative Council entirely, it did not assign a portfolio to it; however, it ultimately appointed William Hamilton to the Council on 10 July 1915 and assigned him the Mines portfolio.

During the term, David Bowman, a former leader of the Labor Party, died; John Adamson left the Ministry and the Labor Party over the conscription issue; and Hamilton was appointed president of the Legislative Council, with Alfred Jones replacing him both as the government's representative in the Council and as a minister.

Second Ministry
The ministry was reconstituted on 30 April 1918 following the 1918 election.

Third Ministry
The ministry was altered on 9 September 1919 following the resignations of Herbert Hardacre and William Lennon; the following ministers served until the end of the ministry on 22 October 1919.

References
 
 
 
 
 

Queensland ministries
Australian Labor Party ministries in Queensland